John McLane (February 27, 1852 – April 13, 1911) was a Scottish-American furniture maker and politician who served as the 50th governor of New Hampshire from 1905 to 1907.

Biography
McLane was born in Lennoxtown, Stirlingshire, in Scotland, the son of Mary, née Hay and Alexander McLane, and was brought to America with his family in 1853, when he was one year old. They settled in Manchester, and moved to Milford in 1869. On finishing school he became a cabinetmaker's apprentice, going on to open his own shop in 1876. The business's success as one of the largest manufacturers of post-office furniture in North America secured other business opportunities for him including becoming director of the Milford Granite Company, the Souheagan National Bank and the New Hampshire Fire Insurance Company.

On 10 March 1880 he married Ellen Luetta Tuck (1855–1927), and together they had four children, Clinton Averill McLane (born 1881), Hazel Ellen McLane (born 1885), John Roy McLane (born 1886), and Charles Malcolm McLane (born 1895). His great-granddaughter, Ann McLane Kuster, is the New Hampshire Representative in the 2nd District in the House of Representatives.

McLane was elected, as a Republican, to the New Hampshire House of Representatives in 1885, and to the New Hampshire Senate in 1891, representing the 16th District 1891-92 and the 15th District 1893-94. He was president of the senate during his two terms. He was a delegate to the Republican National Convention from New Hampshire in 1900, and was elected governor in 1904.

As governor, McLane was instrumental in securing funding for highway improvement, and welcomed delegates to the Russo-Japanese War Peace Conference, which was held in Portsmouth during his term in office.

He died in Pinehurst, Moore County, North Carolina, and was interred at the West Street Cemetery, Milford, New Hampshire.

See also
List of U.S. state governors born outside the United States

References

1852 births
1911 deaths
Republican Party members of the New Hampshire House of Representatives
Republican Party New Hampshire state senators
Republican Party governors of New Hampshire
People from Lennoxtown
Scottish emigrants to the United States
British emigrants to the United States
Politicians from East Dunbartonshire
19th-century American politicians
McLane family of New Hampshire